Cioc-Maidan is a commune and village in the Gagauz Autonomous Territorial Unit of the Republic of Moldova.  The 2004 census listed the commune as having a population of 3,926 people.   Gagauz total 3,657. Minorities included 149 Moldovans, 45 Russians, 33 Ukrainians, 14 Bulgarians and 16 Roma.

Its geographical coordinates are 46° 21' 29" North, 28° 49' 19" East.

References

Cioc-Maidan